Lune Road Ground is a cricket ground in Lancaster, Lancashire.  The ground is situated on the bank of the River Lune.  The first recorded match on the ground was in 1907, when the Lancashire Second XI played Durham in the Minor Counties Championship.

In 1914, the ground held its only first-class match when Lancashire played Warwickshire in the County Championship.

With the first recorded match on the ground in 1907 involving the Lancashire Second XI, the ground has since held a combined total of 9 Second XI fixtures for the Lancashire Second XI in the Minor Counties Championship, Second XI Championship and Second XI Trophy up to 1995.

In local domestic cricket, the ground is the home venue of Lancaster Cricket Club who play in the Palace Shield.

References

External links
Lune Road Ground on CricketArchive
Lune Road Ground on Cricinfo

Cricket grounds in Lancashire
Buildings and structures in Lancaster, Lancashire
Sport in Lancaster, Lancashire
Sports venues completed in 1907
1907 establishments in England